The Vyborg Governorate was a Russian Governorate 1744–1812, which was established in territories ceded by the Swedish Empire in the Great Northern War. By the Treaty of Nystad in 1721, Sweden formally ceded control of the parts of the Viborg and Nyslott County and the Kexholm County located on the Karelian Isthmus and Lake Ladoga area to Russia. First these areas were part of the Saint Petersburg Governorate. Vyborg Governorate was established in 1744 when Sweden ceded control of parts of Kymmenegård and Nyslott County by the Treaty of Åbo. In Sweden (including Finland) the governorate was also known as Old Finland, and between 1802 and 1812 it was named the "Finland Governorate".

During the Napoleonic Wars, the Kingdom of Sweden had allied itself with the Russian Empire, United Kingdom and the other parties against Napoleonic France. However, following the Treaty of Tilsit in 1807, Russia made peace with France. In 1808, and supported by France, Russia successfully challenged the Swedish control over Finland in the Finnish War. In the Treaty of Fredrikshamn on September 17, 1809 Sweden was obliged to cede all its territory in Finland, east of the Torne River, to Russia. The ceded territories became a part of the Russian Empire and was reconstituted into the Grand Duchy of Finland, with the Russian Tsar as Grand Duke.

In 1812 the area of Vyborg Governorate was transferred from Russia proper to the grand duchy and established as Viipuri Province. The transfer, announced by Tsar Alexander I just before Christmas, on December 23, 1811 O.S. (January 4, 1812 N.S.), can be seen as a symbolic gesture and an attempt to appease the sentiment of the Finnish population, which had just experienced Russian conquest of their country by force in the Finnish War.

Governors 

Governorates of the Russian Empire
1744 establishments in the Russian Empire
History of Vyborg
History of Karelia
States and territories established in 1744
1812 disestablishments in Europe